Daniel "Terrible" Turpin is a character published by DC Comics. He first appeared as Brooklyn in Detective Comics #64 (June 1942), and first appeared as Dan Turpin in New Gods #5 (November 1971).

Publication history
Due to a recent retcon, Dan Turpin was made the adult version of Jack Kirby's Golden Age "kid-gang" character Brooklyn, of the Boy Commandos.

Fictional character biography
In Turpin's first appearance he is one of the few citizens of Metropolis aware that a secretive war is taking place in the city between super-powered beings. When this war turns violent, Turpin's boss tries to take him off the case, but Turpin ignores him. Turpin leads the fight against the rampaging Kalibak, using the energy of the entire city to assist Lightray and Orion in defeating him. Turpin suffers multiple injuries but survives.

He keeps his job and becomes Lieutenant Inspector of the Metropolis Special Crimes Unit. In the third  Superboy series, Turpin is sent to Hawaii to investigate whether or not they needed a Special Crimes Unit of their own. While initially skeptical, a visit from the violent Darkseid faction, the Female Furies convinces Turpin that the islands need an SCU. In current Superman titles, Turpin is extremely loyal to Inspector Sawyer, before her transfer to Gotham City. His romantic feelings for her fall apart when he learns she is a lesbian. Turpin has a daughter named Maisie.

He has spent a long time fighting threats in Metropolis; such as the rampaging group of mutants called the 'Underworlders'.

Turpin returns in Final Crisis #1 (May 2008). He had been called back from retirement to investigate the case of several missing kids; this evolves into investigating the death of the New God Orion. Orion passes on several cryptic phrases to Turpin, telling him that "He is in you all!" before finally passing away.

In the second issue, he follows clues given to him by Renee Montoya and The Mad Hatter, investigating The Dark Side Club and journeying to the devastated city of Blüdhaven. There he meets up with Reverend Good, and begins to realize that "there's someone in my head".

In the fourth issue, Turpin, after much inner struggle, is turned into the new host body for Darkseid; Darkseid later reveals that he selected Turpin rather than Batman as a host because Batman would have resisted longer than he wished, while Turpin struggled just enough to make his victory sweeter.

In the sixth issue, Batman uses a gun loaded with a Radion bullet, which is poisonous to the New Gods, to shoot Darkseid in the shoulder. Barry Allen and Wally West, managing to outrun the Black Racer - currently after Barry - so that it takes the currently-weakened Darkseid during a confrontation with Superman. After Darkseid is claimed by the Black Racer, Turpin is reverted to normal and regains control over his body, breathing "In us... in all of us..." in apparent recognition of the meaning of Orion's last words.

Other versions
 In Superman: The Dark Side, an alternate reality in which Superman's rocket crashed down on Apokolips and the infant Superman was raised by Darkseid, Turpin is a member of the Metropolis Special Crimes Unit, who greets Superman when he arrives on Earth from Apokolips.
 In Superman's Metropolis, an alternate reality in which Clarc Kent-son is the adopted son of Jon-Kent and Marta, the founders of Metropolis, and rules the dystopian city, Turpin was among the lower working class who was part of Lois's workers' revolution.
 In Elseworld's Finest, Inspector Turpin is a Metropolis detective who frequently comes into contact with reporter Clark Kent.
 Turpin appears in the Smallville: Season Eleven comic-book continuation of Smallville.
 Turpin appears in Injustice 2 prequel comic series. After the defeat of Superman, Turpin was made the warden of the Lex Luthor Memorial Prison where Superman is kept. He is later killed by Talia al Ghul's secret daughter Athanasia al Ghul when Damian Wayne was being sprung from prison by Talia al Ghul.

In other media

Television
 Dan Turpin appears in Superman: The Animated Series, voiced by Joseph Bologna. This version is physically modeled after Jack Kirby, and is often partnered with Maggie Sawyer as leader of the Special Crimes Unit, occasionally assisting Superman. In the two-part episode "Apokolips... Now!", Dan helps Superman during Darkseid's invasion, and is ultimately killed by Darkseid. Dozens of people attend his funeral as Superman watches from a distance.
 A younger Dan Turpin appears in the Smallville episode "Bulletproof", portrayed by David Paetkau. He appears as a rookie Metropolis Police. Clark meets him at the time when he goes undercover in the Metropolis Police Department following John Jones being shot by a police officer. Dan's fellow police officers Joe Simmons (Jim Thorburton) and Talbert (Ty Olsson) plot to frame Clark for the shooting of Jones. After some persuasion from Clark, Dan turns against Simmons and Talbert where they are defeated by Superman and Green Arrow and arrested. Clark later visited Dan at home while Dan's son was dressed as Robin Hood. Dan notes that Robin Hood was a good guy who didn't appear to be so at a casual glance, helping him reconcile the tactics of vigilantes like Green Arrow and the Red-Blue Blur.

Film
 Dan Turpin has an uncredited cameo in the 2013 direct-to-video film Superman: Unbound. This version is similar in appearance to his Superman: The Animated Series counterpart, and appears as one of the police officers attempting to save Lois Lane from being kidnapped by terrorists.
 Dan Turpin appears in The Death of Superman, voiced by Rick Pasqualone. This version is a police officer who works with Maggie Sawyer. Superman saves them both from Intergang at the film's beginning.

Graphic audio
 Inspector Turpin also appears in the Graphic Audio production of Superman: The Never Ending Battle.

Notes

References

External links
Dan Turpin at the DCU Guide

Characters created by Jack Kirby
Characters created by Joe Simon
Comics characters introduced in 1942
Fictional American Jews
Fictional characters from New York City
Fictional detectives
Fictional World War II veterans
Metropolis Police Department officers